Fuzon may refer to:

Fuzon (Blake), a character from The Book of Ahania by William Blake
Fuzön, a band from Pakistan